Valeriy Heorhievych Onufer (Валерій Георгійович Онуфер, 10 February 1954 – 12 February 2011) was a Ukrainian football referee.

He was a referee at the Euro 2000 qualification match between San Marino and Austria that took place on 14 October 1998 in Serravalle, San Marino.

References

External links
 
 Valeriy Onufer referee profile at allplayers.in.ua

1954 births
2011 deaths
Sportspeople from Uzhhorod
Soviet football referees
Ukrainian football referees